Sil Laurentius Swinkels (born 6 January 2004) is a Dutch footballer who currently plays as a defender for Aston Villa.

Early life
Swinkels was born in Sint-Oedenrode.

Club career
Having played youth football for RKSV Rhode, Helmond Sport, Brabant United and Vitesse, he joined Aston Villa's academy in summer 2020.

Swinkels made an unexpected first team debut for Aston Villa when, due to a COVID-19 outbreak, Villa were forced to play an inexperienced squad in an FA Cup Third Round tie against Liverpool on 8 January 2021.

On 24 May 2021, Swinkels was part of the Aston Villa U18s team that won the FA Youth Cup, beating Liverpool U18s 2–1 in the final. On 10 August 2021, he signed his first professional contract with Aston Villa.

International career
Swinkels played for Netherlands at the under-15 level. On 6 September 2021, Swinkels made his debut for Netherlands U18 in a 5–0 friendly victory over Italy. He scored his first goal at youth international level for Netherlands U18s, on 28 March 2022, in a 4–1 away victory over Germany.

Career statistics

Club

Honours

Aston Villa U18s 
FA Youth Cup: 2020–21

References

2004 births
Living people
Dutch footballers
Netherlands youth international footballers
Dutch expatriate footballers
Association football defenders
Helmond Sport players
SBV Vitesse players
Aston Villa F.C. players
Dutch expatriate sportspeople in England
Expatriate footballers in England